Lakshya Sen (born 16 August 2001) is an Indian badminton player. Sen is a former world junior no. 1. He has won gold medals at the 2018 Asian Junior Championships in the boys' singles and at the Summer Youth Olympics in the mixed team event. He won the bronze medal at the 2021 World Championships and was 
runner-up at the 2022 All England Open. Sen was also a part of the Indian team which won the Thomas Cup 2022. He also won the gold medal at the 2022 Commonwealth Games held in Birmingham in men's singles badminton.

Personal life 
Sen, was born in Almora in Uttarakhand. His father, D. K. Sen, is a coach in India and his brother, Chirag Sen is also an international badminton player.

Career

2016 
Having trained at the Prakash Padukone Badminton Academy, Sen had shown his talent as a badminton player at a very young age, and had a brilliant year in the junior badminton circuit in 2016. He clinched the bronze medal at Junior Asian Championship after losing to Sun Feixiang 12–21,16-21. Coincidently, Sen lost to Sun again in the pre-quarters of Junior World Championship 21–17,8-21 and 13–21,His team finished 8th in the team event. Sen also competed in the senior international level and won the men's singles title at the 2016 India International Series tournament.

2017 
Sen started the year at Syed Modi International where he lost in the pre-quarters to compatriot Sourabh Verma 14–21,16-21.
Sen became the number one junior singles player in BWF World Junior ranking in February 2017. At the Junior Asian Championship, Sen was seeded as no.1 but lost in the pre-quarters to Lin Chun-yi 21–13,23-25 and 20–22. Sen reached the Quarter-finals of Vietnam Open before losing to Kodai Naraoka 21–17,21-23 and 10–21. Sen was seeded as no.2 at the Junior World Championship but in the Quarter-finals, he again lost to Kodai Naraoka 21–14,17-21,14-21.

2018 

Sen defeated Cheam June Wei a much higher ranked player than him 21–11,21-16 in straight games at the New Zealand Open but lost to 2 time Olympic gold medallist and seed no.1 Lin Dan 21–15,15-21 and 12–21. At the Australian Open, He lost to seed no.7 Lee Cheuk Yiu 20–22,21-13 and 19–21. Sen emerged as the champion at the 2018 Asian Junior Championships defeating the top seeded World Junior No. 1 Kunlavut Vitidsarn in the final 21–19,21-18.

At the Hyderabad Open, Sen lost to seed no. 8 Heo Kwang-hee 13-21 and 12–21. Sen defeated seed no.2 Sitthikom Thammasin 21–14,21-19 in the pre-quarters of 2018 Bangka Belitung Indonesia Masters but lost to seed no.7 Lin Yu-hsien 21–12,20-21 and 14–21 in the Quarter-finals.

Sen participated at the 2018 Summer Youth Olympics as the fourth seeded. He settled for boys' singles silver medal after losing to Chinese player Li Shifeng in straight games 15–21, 19–21. He also competed in the mixed team event, and helped team Alpha win the gold medal.

Sen clinched the bronze medal at the BWF Junior World Championships after losing to the eventual champion Kunlavut Vitidsarn in the semi-finals 22–20,16-21,13-21.

2019 
Sen won the Belgian International tournament by beating Victor Svendsen 21-14 and 21–15. Sen clinched his first BWF Tour title by winning the Dutch Open men's singles title after beating Yusuke Onodera of Japan. The Dutch Open is a BWF Tour Super 100 tournament. In November 2019, he won the SaarLorLux Open which is a BWF Tour Super 100 tournament held in Saarbrücken, Germany. He defeated China's Weng Hongyang in the final to claim the title.

He won the men's singles title in the 2019 Scottish Open in November, with a victory against Brazilian Ygor Coelho.

2020 
Sen was a member of the Indian team which clinched the bronze medal at 2020 Badminton Asia Team Championships.

Sen reached the 2nd round of 2020 All England Open which was his 1st ever BWF Super 1000 Tournament before losing to the champion and world no.1 Viktor Axelsen 17-21 and 18–21. He lost to Hans-Kristian Vittinghus 21–15,7-21 and 15–21 in 2nd round of the 2020 Denmark Open. Sen was seeded as no.2 at 2020 SaarLorLux Open but withdrew due to an injury. The Covid-19 Pandemic restricted him to play any more international BWF Tournaments in the year.

2021 
In December, he reached the World Championships semifinals where he lost to compatriot Srikanth Kidambi in a hard-fought match 21–17, 14–21, 17–21 and settled for a bronze medal.

2022 
In January, he defeated the reigning world champion Loh Kean Yew in the India Open final, thus clinching his first Super 500 title. He defeated Loh in two straight games 24–22, 21–17. In the German Open, Lakshya defeated World No.1 Viktor Axelsen in the semifinals, but lost the finals to Kunlavut Vitidsarn. He then defeated World No. 3 Anders Antonsen and World No. 7 Lee Zii Jia to reach the finals of the 2022 All England Open. He lost the finals to Viktor Axelsen 10–21, 15–21. He subsequently withdrew from the Swiss Open, as he was tired after playing 2 back-to-back BWF tournaments finals. Lakshya Sen was part of the Indian men's team for 2022 Thomas Cup. The team went on to win the Thomas Cup by beating Indonesia 3–0, with Sen winning his match against Anthony Sinisuka Ginting. He became Commonwealth champion at 2022 Commonwealth Games by defeating Ng Tze Yong of Malaysia in the final. Sen was also part of the Indian team that won silver in the mixed team event.

Honours
 Bestowed with Arjuna Award for badminton in November 2022

Achievements

World Championships 
Men's singles

Commonwealth Games
Men's singles

Youth Olympic Games
Boys' singles

World Junior Championships 
Boys' singles

Asia Junior Championships 
Boys' singles

BWF World Tour (3 titles, 2 runners-up) 
The BWF World Tour, which was announced on 19 March 2017 and implemented in 2018, is a series of elite badminton tournaments sanctioned by the Badminton World Federation (BWF). The BWF World Tour is divided into levels of World Tour Finals, Super 1000, Super 750, Super 500, Super 300, and the BWF Tour Super 100.

Men's singles

BWF International Challenge/Series (7 titles, 3 runners-up) 
Men's singles

  BWF International Challenge tournament
  BWF International Series tournament
  BWF Future Series tournament

BWF Junior International (2 titles, 1 runner-up) 
Boys' singles

  BWF Junior International Grand Prix tournament
  BWF Junior International Challenge tournament
  BWF Junior International Series tournament
  BWF Junior Future Series tournament

Career overview

Record against selected opponents 
Record against Year-end Finals finalists, World Championships semi-finalists, and Olympic quarter-finalists. Accurate as of 27 October 2022.

Awards and recognition

National 
 Arjuna Award: 2022

References

External links 
 

2001 births
Living people
People from Almora
Racket sportspeople from Uttarakhand
Indian male badminton players
Badminton players at the 2018 Summer Youth Olympics
Badminton players at the 2022 Commonwealth Games
Commonwealth Games gold medallists for India
Commonwealth Games silver medallists for India
Commonwealth Games medallists in badminton
Recipients of the Arjuna Award
Medallists at the 2022 Commonwealth Games